XHYI-FM 93.1/XEYI-AM 580 is a combo radio station in Cancún, Quintana Roo. It is owned by Grupo ACIR and carries its Mix adult contemporary format.

History
XEYI received its first concession on January 17, 1980. It was owned by Ricardo López Méndez. In 1993, the concession was transferred to Radiodifusora Comercial XEYI, S.A. de C.V., and the next year, the station became an AM-FM combo.

In 2000, the concession was transferred to Radio Integral as part of a consolidation of concessions held by Grupo ACIR.

References

Radio stations in Quintana Roo
Radio stations established in 1980
Grupo ACIR